Bruce Wallace may refer to:

 Bruce A. Wallace (1905–1977), American politician in the New Jersey Senate
 B. Alan Wallace (born 1950), American author and expert on Tibetan Buddhism
 Bruce Wallace (geneticist) (1920–2015), American scientist